Wangcheng Subdistrict is a subdistrict of Linli County in Hunan, China. The subdistrict was incorporated from a part of the former Anfu Town in 2017. The subdistrict has 4 villages and 6 communities under its jurisdiction, its seat is Yingbinlu Community.

Subdivisions

References

Linli County
Subdistricts of Hunan